Sanasar is a tourist destination and the name given to the two small villages of Sana and Sar in Ramban District, Jammu and Kashmir, India.

The area is notable for its scenic views of mountain ranges including the Brammah Massif.

Nearby sights 

A nearby mountain range is called the Shanta Ridge. The 400-year-old temple is dedicated to Nag Shankh Pal. No mortar was used to join the stones of the temple.

Shanta Gala is a pass on the Shanta ridge which offers a view of the Panchari valley on the other side of the ridge.  The pass leads to the Lander area.

References

Villages in Udhampur district